Lae Urban LLG is a local-level government (LLG) of Morobe Province, Papua New Guinea.

See also
Suburbs of Lae

References

Local-level governments of Morobe Province